Izmalkovo is the name of several rural localities in Russia:
Izmalkovo, Lipetsk Oblast, a selo in Izmalkovsky Selsoviet of Izmalkovsky District of Lipetsk Oblast
Izmalkovo, Moscow Oblast, a village under the administrative jurisdiction of  the City of Odintsovo, Odintsovsky District, Moscow Oblast
Izmalkovo, Pskov Oblast, a village in Bezhanitsky District of Pskov Oblast